The Apostolic Nunciature to Haiti the diplomatic mission of the Holy See to Haiti. It is located in Port-au-Prince. The current Apostolic Nuncio is Archbishop Francisco Escalante Molina, who was named to the position by Pope Francis on 4 June 2021.

The Apostolic Nunciature to the Republic of Haiti is an ecclesiastical office of the Catholic Church in Haiti, with the rank of an embassy. The nuncio serves both as the ambassador of the Holy See to the President of Haiti, and as delegate and point-of-contact between the Catholic hierarchy in Haiti and the Pope.

Representatives of the Holy See to Haiti
Apostolic delegates
Joseph Rosati (30 April 1841 – 25 September 1843)
Giovanni Monetti (30 October 1860 – 1861)
Martial-Guillaume-Marie Testard du Cosquer (29 November 1861 – 1 October 1863)
 (28 July 1874 – 9 August 1883)
Bernardino di Milia (13 May 1884 – November 1890)
Spiridion-Salvatore-Costantino Buhadgiar (28 November 1890 – 10 August 1891)
Giulio Tonti (10 August 1892 – 21 July 1902)
Apostolic internuncios
Francesco Cherubini (13 November 1915 – 2 March 1920)
George Joseph Caruana (28 January 1927 – September 1930)
Apostolic nuncios
Giuseppe Fietta (23 September 1930 – 24 July 1936)
Maurilio Silvani (24 July 1936 – 23 May 1942)
Alfredo Pacini (23 April 1946 – 23 April 1949)
Francesco Lardone (21 May 1949 – 21 November 1953)
Luigi Raimondi (24 December 1953 – 15 December 1956)
Domenico Enrici (30 January 1958 – 5 January 1960)
Giovanni Ferrofino (8 February 1960 – 3 November 1965)
Marie-Joseph Lemieux (16 September 1966 – 30 May 1969)
Luigi Barbarito (10 June 1969 – 5 April 1975)
Luigi Conti (1 August 1975 – 19 November 1983)
Paolo Romeo (17 December 1983 – 24 April 1990)
Giuseppe Leanza (3 July 1990 – 4 June 1991)
Lorenzo Baldisseri (15 January 1992 – 6 April 1995)
Christophe Pierre (12 July 1995 – 10 May 1999)
Luigi Bonazzi (19 June 1999 – 30 March 2004)
Mario Giordana (27 April 2004 – 15 March 2008)
Bernardito Auza (8 May 2008 – 1 July 2014)
Eugene Nugent (10 January 2015 – 7 January 2021)
 Francisco Escalante Molina (4 June 2021 – present)

See also
Roman Catholicism in Haiti
Religion in Haiti

Notes

References

External links
Nunciature to Haiti page at catholic-hierarchy.org
Apostolic Nunciature of Haiti page at gcatholic.org

Haiti
Catholic Church in Haiti
Haiti–Holy See relations